Abdul Matin Chowdhury may refer to:

 Abdul Matin Chowdhury (1921–1981), Bangladeshi academic and physicist
 Abdul Matin Chowdhury (politician) (1944–2012), Bangladeshi politician
 Abdul Matin Chowdhury (scholar) (1915–1990), Bangladeshi religious scholar and political activist
 Abdul Matin Chaudhary (1895–1948), Pakistani Bengali politician and minister